Nguyễn Kiều Oanh (born 10 March 1969) is a Vietnamese butterfly and medley swimmer. She competed at the 1988 Summer Olympics and the 1992 Summer Olympics.

References

External links
 

1969 births
Living people
Vietnamese female butterfly swimmers
Vietnamese female medley swimmers
Olympic swimmers of Vietnam
Swimmers at the 1988 Summer Olympics
Swimmers at the 1992 Summer Olympics
Place of birth missing (living people)
21st-century Vietnamese women